Nasonov is a Russian masculine surname, its feminine counterpart is Nasonova. It may refer to

Nikolai Nasonov (1855–1939), Russian zoologist
Nasonov pheromone
Nasonov's gland
Oleksandr Nasonov (born 1992), Ukrainian football defender
Olga Antonova (athlete) (née Nasonova; born 1960), Russian sprinter

Russian-language surnames